Qarajeh-ye Mohammad (also Romanized as Qarājeh-ye Moḩammad and Qarājeh Moḩammad; also known as Gharajeh Mohammad, Qarajeh, and Verkhnyaya Karadzha) is a village in Koshksaray Rural District, in the Central District of Marand County, East Azerbaijan Province, Iran. At the 2006 census, its population was 1,396, in 343 families.

References 

Populated places in Marand County